List of marathon races may refer to:

List of World Athletics Label marathon races
List of marathon races in Africa
List of marathon races in Asia
List of marathon races in Europe
List of marathon races in Oceania
List of marathon races in North America
List of marathon races in South America

Marathons are also held in unpopulated places; see  Antarctic Ice Marathon, Antarctica Marathon, and North Pole Marathon.